Carly Ryan (31 January 1992 – 20 February 2007) was an Australian schoolgirl who was befriended online and then murdered by a serial paedophile, 50-year-old Garry Francis Newman. The case, which highlighted the emerging phenomena of catfishing, child grooming, and online predatory behaviour, was unique at the time, given that Ryan was the first person in Australia to be killed by an online predator. In the wake of the arrest and trial of Newman, public opinion eventually led to nationwide legal changes, nicknamed "Carly's Law", being made to help protect minors online.

Background
Ryan lived in Stirling, South Australia with her mother, Sonya Ryan. Approximately 18 months before her death, while using MySpace (and Vampirefreaks.com), she befriended "Brandon Kane", a fictitious Texas-born teen living in Melbourne, which eventually grew into an online and telephone romance. In January 2007, Garry Newman travelled from Melbourne posing as "Shane", the father of Brandon, in order to give Ryan presents (lingerie and a nurse's outfit) from the non-existent Brandon. After meeting her mother, he was then allowed to attend Ryan's 15th birthday party and stay overnight. After a shopping trip together, Newman's increasingly erratic and possessive behaviour at the party, and inappropriate physical advances (including laying onto Ryan's bed with her), he was told to leave by Sonya Ryan, who then began monitoring Ryan's Internet usage more closely.

Investigation
Later, on 19 February, Ryan left the house for an apparent sleepover with friends, but after not returning the next day, the police were notified. The same morning, at Horseshoe Bay in Port Elliot, Ryan's battered and dishevelled body was found floating face-down in the shallow water, and attempts to revive her failed.
{{infobox event
| image = Horseshoe Bay Panoroma.jpg
| caption = Horseshoe Bay, the location of Ryan’s murder
| date = 
| location = Lot 850 Basham Parade, Port Elliot, South Australia
| coordinates = 
| deaths = Carly Ryan
| type = Murder by assault, suffocation, and drowning
| motive = Failed attempt at sexual predation
| convictions = Garry Francis NewmanGuilty of murder
Newman's sonNot guilty of all charges
| sentence = Garry NewmanLife imprisonment with 29-year non-parole period}}
The autopsy revealed 19 separate injuries, with six to eight of them being blows to the head, and the cause of death was a combination of facial trauma, smothering, and drowning. It also revealed cannabinoids in Ryan's bloodstream and beach sand in her oesophagus. Investigators examined security footage, which showed Ryan in and around Port Elliot on 19 February, in the company of two men, and she was last seen alive by witnesses at the beach at 9:30 PM.

A pale blue vehicle used by the men led police to Mornington Peninsula, where a raid (11 days after the murder) led to the arrest of Newman, and the detention of Newman's younger son. A search revealed that Newman had kept a notebook detailing some 200 online personas, and other criminal attempts at grooming both in Australia and internationally. At trial, Newman, who was initially not identified to the media, acted erratically and initially denied meeting the teenager. On 21 January 2010, Newman was sentenced to life imprisonment with a 29-year non-parole period. Newman's adopted son, who was a minor at the time and a witness to the killing, was cleared of all charges and his identity remains suppressed.

Reaction
After the trial, Sonya Ryan helped to set up The Carly Ryan Foundation, a non-profit charity created to promote internet safety. In 2013, the foundation began lobbying for a legal change to improve the protection of minors online, particularly given that 25% of teenage Australians are being contacted online by people they do not know. The foundation also promoted safety awareness in Australia and New Zealand (such as the use of online contracts), and created a smartphone application, called Thread, as a personal safety app for children. Sonya Ryan also received a South Australian of the Year Award in 2013 for services to the community, as well as various other awards in 2017, 2018 and 2021.

Legal changes
 National 
After a number of unsuccessful proposals by Senator Nick Xenophon's team, on 25 May 2017, a bill titled Criminal Code Amendment (Protecting Minors Online) Bill 2017 was submitted to the Parliament of Australia. The purpose of the bill was:

to introduce an offence to criminalise acts done using a carriage service to prepare or plan to cause harm to, procure, or engage in sexual activity with, a person under the age of 16. This expressly includes a person misrepresenting their age online as part of a plan to cause harm to another person under 16 years of age.

It proposed changes to three federal Australian laws: Criminal Code Act 1995; Crimes Act 1914; and, Telecommunications (Interception and Access) Act 1979.'' The amended bill was passed at the federal level and enacted into law on 23 June 2017.

South Australia 
A similar, but tighter version of the law initially failed to pass the Legislative Council in South Australia in 2013. Later, following a petition, an amended bill was introduced by Attorney-General Vickie Chapman, and was passed by the Parliament of South Australia on 5 July 2018, which made it an offence for an adult (aged 18 or older) to lie to a child about their age or who they are and then attempt to meet that child. These amendments came into effect on 13 August 2018.

See also
Internet homicide
Murder of Kacie Woody
Alicia Kozakiewicz

References

External links
Carly Ryan Foundation

1992 births
2007 deaths
Cybercrime in Australia
Murder in South Australia
Murdered Australian children
People murdered in South Australia
People from South Australia
2007 murders in Australia
Incidents of violence against girls
Female murder victims
Deaths by person in Australia
Myspace
Foundations based in Australia
Internet-related activism
Internet in Australia
Non-profit organisations based in South Australia